Youniverse (styled as YOUniverse) (YOUniverse – ) is a 2018 Thai streaming television series starring Korapat Kirdpan (Nanon), Ployshompoo Supasap (Jan), Wachirawit Ruangwiwat (Chimon) and Apichaya Saejung (Ciize).

Directed by Pawis Sowsrion and produced by GMMTV, the series premiered on LINE TV, Facebook and YouTube on 24 April 2018, airing on Tuesdays and Thursdays at 18:00 ICT. It concluded on 3 May 2018.

Cast and characters 
Below are the cast of the series:

Main 
 Korapat Kirdpan (Nanon) as Knight
 Ployshompoo Supasap (Jan) as Sun
 Wachirawit Ruangwiwat (Chimon) as Earth
 Apichaya Saejung (Ciize) as Nik

Guest role 
 Weerayut Chansook (Arm) as an ice cream shop owner

Soundtrack

References

External links 
 YOUniverse on LINE TV
 
 GMMTV

Television series by GMMTV
Thai romance television series
2018 Thai television series debuts
2018 Thai television series endings